Andy Golledge is an Australian country music singer and songwriter. He released his debut studio album, Strength of a Queen on 4 March 2022. For Golledge said Strength of a Queen is ultimately a journey saying "It's a search for somebody that loves you for who you are, and who you want to be, and ultimately sharing that journey together. It's about finding the strength of a queen within you and within another."

Discography

Albums

Extended plays

Notes

Awards and nominations

ARIA Music Awards
The ARIA Music Awards is an annual ceremony presented by Australian Recording Industry Association (ARIA), which recognise excellence, innovation, and achievement across all genres of the music of Australia. They commenced in 1987.

! 
|-
| 2022 || Strength of a Queen || ARIA Award for Best Country Album ||  || 
|}

AIR Awards
The Australian Independent Record Awards (known colloquially as the AIR Awards) is an annual awards night to recognise, promote and celebrate the success of Australia's Independent Music sector.

! 
|-
| 2021
| Namoi
| Best Independent Country Album or EP
| 
| 
|}

Country Music Awards of Australia
The Country Music Awards of Australia is an annual awards night held in January during the Tamworth Country Music Festival. Celebrating recording excellence in the Australian country music industry. They commenced in 1973.
 

! 
|-
| 2023 || Strength of a Queen || Alt. Country Album of the Year ||  || 
|-

References

Living people
Australian country singers
Australian country singer-songwriters
21st-century Australian singers
21st-century Australian male singers
Australian male singer-songwriters
Year of birth missing (living people)